KNUM-LP is a low-power FM radio station broadcasting on 96.7 FM in Portland, Oregon, United States. It is owned by the Community Alliance of Tenants and is known as "96.7 The Numberz", airing a rap and hip-hop format. In 2017, a series of strange noises heard from the station gained popular social media attention and speculation, but has since been reclassified into the rap/hip-hop station it is today.

History
On November 15, 2013, the Community Alliance of Tenants, a tenants rights organization, applied to build a new low-power FM radio station on 96.7 MHz in Portland. The Federal Communications Commission approved its application in September 2014 as two of the four applicants for the frequency dropped out and the other two—the Community Alliance and Opal Environmental Justice Oregon—moved their LP facilities to avoid interference with each other.

The station filed for its license to cover on September 20, 2017, having gone on air under the call sign KZRY-LP. Behind the founding of the station were two graduates of Grant High School, one of which was a founder of KXRY (branded as "XRAY.FM"). In its initial months on air as KZRY-LP, it aired a loop featuring audio of speeches by Martin Luther King Jr. and John F. Kennedy and from the Apollo 11 mission, Sputnik 1, some music, and programs from XRAY.

A year later, on August 29, 2018, the station began operating normally and changed its call sign to KNUM-LP, reflecting its on-air brand referencing the Portland area to which many black residents have been displaced as a result of gentrification.

References

External links

NUM-LP
NUM-LP
African-American history in Portland, Oregon
2017 establishments in Oregon
African-American history of Oregon